The 2012–13 Macedonian Football Cup was the 21st season of Macedonia's football knockout competition. Renova are the defending champions, having won their first title. The 2012–13 champions were FK Teteks who won their second title.

Competition calendar

First round
Matches were played on 21 and 22 August 2012.

|colspan="3" style="background-color:#97DEFF" align=center|21 August 2012

|-
|colspan="3" style="background-color:#97DEFF" align=center|22 August 2012

|}

Second round
Entering this round are the 16 winners from the First Round. The first legs took place on 9 and 19 September 2012 and the second legs took place on 26 and 27 September 2012.

|}

Quarter-finals
The first legs of the quarter-finals took place on 14 October and 7 November 2012, while the second legs took place on 21 November 2012.

|}

Semi-finals
The first legs of the semi finals took place on 17 April 2013, while the second legs took place on 2 May 2013.

Summary

|}

Matches

1–1 on aggregate. Shkëndija won on away goals.

Teteks won 3–0 on aggregate.

Final

Original Match

Initial match was played on 22 May 2013, but the game was abandoned just 10 minutes after the start, because of the crowd trouble.

Rematch

See also
2012–13 Macedonian First Football League
2012–13 Macedonian Second Football League
2012–13 Macedonian Third Football League

References

External links
 Official Website

Macedonia
Cup
Macedonian Football Cup seasons